Joyce Bagala is a Ugandan journalist and politician. Formerly served as the news manager at Next Media, NBS television. In the 2021 general election, running on the National Unity Platform ticket, she was elected Women's Representative for Mityana District 2021-2026.

Early life and education 
Bagala is a Muganda by tribe. She comes from the family of the late Petero Ntwatwa, who served as the Buganda Lukiiko speaker in the 1960s, and maternal grandfather Rev William Ssewanyana Katula, the former Mityana diocesan secretary. She lost both her parents at a young age and was raised by her maternal aunt, Josephine Esther Nansikombi.

She went to Mityana Junior School, Gombe SS and UMCAT School of Journalism and Mass Communication. She later went to Makerere University to pursue a degree in mass communication.

Journalism career 
Bagala joined NBS TV in 2016 and has been the flagship anchor of Amasengejje, the 7 pm Luganda news broadcast. She also worked at Radio One Uganda. Bagala worked as a news reader in English at Beat FM, Buddu FM and Sanyu FM. She started anchoring Luganda news at Sanyu FM. In 2019, Bagala was one of the news managers suspended from work on the directive of the Uganda Communications Commission for giving coverage to Presidential Hopefiul, and Kyadondo East MP Robert Kyagulanyi aka Bobi Wine protests. Uganda Communications Commission suspended all officers at various media houses who were in charge of broadcasts. She threatened to sue the station for wrongful dismissal, a threat that never yielded.

In 2019, she was reported to have ended her 11-year career at Radio One Uganda to create time to make a come back in the upcoming 2021 elections with the current Mityana District woman member of Parliament, Judith Nabakooba. Bagala, however, has retained her job at NBS television.

Political career 
In 2019, she hinted about retiring from media to join politics. However, she contested the 2016 general elections and lost to Judith Nabakooba, who was the NRM candidate for Mityana Woman MP. Three years prior, she also contested the elections raced with her cousin Namuleme Esther Ntwatwa, and they both lost to Nabakooba. On October 22-2020, the high court in Mubende nullified Joyce Bagala's election as Mityana woman member of parliament and called for fresh elections, following a petition by lands Minister Judith Nabakooba. Bagala was sued by Minister of Lands, Housing and Urban Planning Judith Nabakooba who claimed voter bribery and vote rigging

Personal life 
Bagala is married with two children.

See also 
 NBS television

External links 
 Website of NBS Television Uganda

References 

Living people
Year of birth missing (living people)
Ugandan women journalists
Ugandan journalists
Ugandan radio journalists
Ugandan women radio journalists
Ugandan radio presenters
Ugandan women radio presenters
Ugandan television journalists
Ugandan women television journalists
Ugandan women television presenters
Ugandan television presenters
Makerere University alumni
Members of the Parliament of Uganda
Women members of the Parliament of Uganda